"Keep On" is a post-disco song written by Hubert Eaves III, James Williams of D. Train. It was remixed by François Kevorkian and Eaves. The song reached #2 on Billboard 's Hot Dance Club Play chart and number #15 on R&B chart in 1982.

Track listing
 12" single

Personnel
Herb Powers Jr. – mastering 
François Kevorkian, Hubert Eaves III – mixing
 Hubert Eaves III – rhythm arrangement, producer 
 Hubert Eaves III, James "D-Train" Williams - vocal arrangement

Chart positions

Legacy
"Keep On" was sampled by Rockers Revenge on the song "Walking on Sunshine" in late 1982. It was also sampled for the chorus of the Notorious B.I.G. song "Sky's the Limit".

References 

1982 singles
D Train (entertainer) songs
Garage house songs
Prelude Records (record label) singles
1981 songs
Songs written by Hubert Eaves III